The 1st Annual Kids' Choice Sports was held on July 17, 2014, at the Pauley Pavilion in Los Angeles, California. Hall of Fame Athlete/Talk Show host Michael Strahan hosted the ceremony to celebrate kids’ favorites in the sports world. The show aired on Nickelodeon from 8 p.m. to 9:30 p.m. ET/PT, tape delayed for West Coast in the United States and Canada. When this award show aired, Nickelodeon took their other channels off the air with a message telling people to go watch the awards show on the main channel.

Sports Council

A Kids' Choice Sports Council was formed to "lend their expertise and experience to help inform the awards show, consult on the nominee process and give feedback on categories."
Committee members are:
 Baron Davis (former New York Knicks and two-time NBA All-Star)
 Ken Griffey Jr. (former baseball outfielder and 13-time All-Star)
 Lisa Leslie (former WNBA MVP and four-time Olympic gold medal winner)
 Cal Ripken Jr. (former shortstop and third baseman for the Baltimore Orioles and 19-time All-Star)
 Deion Sanders (NFL Pro Football Hall of Famer)
 Misty May-Treanor (three-time Olympic beach volleyball gold medalist)
 Andy Elkin (Agent, Creative Artists Agency)
 Tracy Perlman (VP Entertainment Marketing and Promotions, NFL)
 Jeff Schwartz (President and Founder, Excel Sports Management)
 Jill Smoller (SVP, William Morris Endeavor)
 Leah Wilcox (VP, Talent Relations, NBA)
 Alan Zucker (SVP, IMG Clients Group)
 Michael Phelps (most decorated Olympian of all time)
 Tony Hawk (professional skateboarder)
 Zane Stoddard (VP, Entertainment Marketing and Content Development, NASCAR)

Presenters, performers, and stunts

Host
 Michael Strahan 
 Carlos PenaVega and Kira Kosarin (Orange Carpet)

Musical performers
 Florida Georgia Line - "Cruise" and "This Is How We Roll"
 Pharrell Williams - "Happy"

Presenters

Will Arnett 
Russell Westbrook
Nick Cannon
Victor Cruz
Stephen Curry 
Carlos PenaVega
Larry Fitzgerald
Megan Fox
Tia Mowry

Dwayne "The Rock" Johnson
Bethany Hamilton
Tony Hawk 
George Lopez
Henrik Lundqvist
Marshawn Lynch 
McKayla Maroney 
Floyd Mayweather Jr.
Dominic Monaghan
Rico Rodriguez
Metta World Peace

Slime stunt
 Power Dunk Challenge – Larry Fitzgerald (winner) dunked Earl Thomas III into a giant tank of slime, then got dropped himself into a vat.

Gold Slime
 After David Beckham accepted the Legend Award, he and his two sons got slimed. The slime was a metallic gold color for the first time.

Legend Award
 David Beckham (winner)

Winners and nominees

Best Male Athlete
 Kevin Durant (Oklahoma City Thunder) (winner)
 Tom Brady (New England Patriots)
 Dale Earnhardt Jr. (NASCAR)
 LeBron James (Miami Heat)
 Derek Jeter (New York Yankees)
 Peyton Manning (Denver Broncos)
 Dwyane Wade (Miami Heat)
 Tiger Woods (Golf)

Best Female Athlete
 Gabby Douglas (US Gymnastics) (winner)
 Gracie Gold (US Figure Skater)
 Candace Parker (Los Angeles Sparks)
 Danica Patrick (NASCAR)
 Hope Solo (Women's Soccer)
 Lindsey Vonn (US Skiing)
 Serena Williams (Women's Tennis)

Favorite Newcomer
 Russell Wilson (Seattle Seahawks) (winner)
 Skylar Diggins (Tulsa Shock)
 Bryce Harper (Washington Nationals)
 Yasiel Puig (Los Angeles Dodgers)
 Sloane Stephens (Women's Tennis)
 Mike Trout (Los Angeles Angels)

Favorite Catch
 Dez Bryant (Dallas Cowboys) (winner)
 Calvin Johnson (Detroit Lions)
 Yasiel Puig (Los Angeles Dodgers)
 Mike Trout (Los Angeles Angels)

Best Save
 Tim Howard (Everton Football Club and the US Men's Soccer Team) (winner)
 Henrik Lundqvist (New York Rangers)
 Ryan Miller (St. Louis Blues)
 Jonathan Quick (Los Angeles Kings)
 Hope Solo (Women's Soccer)

Clutch Player of the Year
 Carmelo Anthony (New York Knicks) (winner)
 Skylar Diggins (Tulsa Shock)
 Kevin Durant (Oklahoma City Thunder)
 LeBron James (Cleveland Cavaliers)
 Marshawn Lynch (Seattle Seahawks)
 David Ortiz (Boston Red Sox)
 Abby Wambach (US Women's Soccer Team)

Sickest Moves
 Alex Morgan (US Women's Soccer Team) (winner)
 Sidney Crosby (Pittsburgh Penguins)
 Landon Donovan (Los Angeles Galaxy and the US Men's Soccer Team)
 Blake Griffin (Los Angeles Clippers)
 Lionel Messi (FC Barcelona and the Argentina National Team)
 Alexander Ovechkin (Washington Capitals) (winner)
 Chris Paul (Los Angeles Clippers)
 Adrian Peterson (Minnesota Vikings)

Don't Try This At Home Award
 Shaun White (Snowboarder and Skateboarder) (winner)
 Nyjah Huston (Street Skateboarder)
 Travis Pastrana (Motorsports Competitor)
 Kelly Slater (Surfer)
 Lindsey Vonn (US Skiing)

Smells Like Team Spirit
 Seattle Seahawks Fans (12th Man) (winner)
 Detroit Red Wings Fans (Hockeytown)
 Green Bay Fans (Cheeseheads)
 Oakland Raiders Fans (Black Hole)
 Oklahoma City Thunder Fans (Thunder)
 Pittsburgh Steelers Fans (Terrible Towels)

Party Like a Sports Star
 Victor Cruz (New York Giants) (winner)
 Knowshon Moreno (Miami Dolphins)
 Rafael Nadal (Tennis)
 Cam Newton (Carolina Panthers)
 Cristiano Ronaldo (Real Madrid and Portugal National Team)
 Abby Wambach (US Women's Soccer)

King of Swag
 Dwyane Wade (Miami Heat) (winner)
 Eric Decker (Denver Broncos)
 Henrik Lundqvist (New York Rangers)
 Cristiano Ronaldo (Real Madrid and Portugal National Team)
 Amar'e Stoudemire (New York Knicks)
 Russell Westbrook (Oklahoma City Thunder)

Queen of Swag
 Gabby Douglas (US Gymnast) (winner)
 Skylar Diggins (Tulsa Shock)
 Lolo Jones (US Track and Field and Bobsled)
 Maria Sharapova (Women's Tennis)
 Lindsey Vonn (US Skiing)
 Serena Williams (Women's Tennis)

Biggest Cannon
 Novak Djokovic (Tennis) (winner)
 Serena Williams (Women`s Tennis)
 Clayton Kershaw (Los Angeles Dodgers)
 Cam Newton (Carolina Panthers)
 Aaron Rodgers (Green Bay Packers)
 Ben Roethlisberger (Pittsburgh Steelers)
 Justin Verlander (Detroit Tigers)

Favorite Comeback Athlete
 Bethany Hamilton (Surfer) (winner)
 Peyton Manning (Denver Broncos)
 Adrian Peterson (Minnesota Vikings)
 Albert Pujols (Los Angeles Angels)
 Rajon Rondo (Boston Celtics)
 Russell Westbrook (Oklahoma City Thunder)

References

External links
Nick.com's Official Kids' Choice Sports website

Sports
Kids' Choice Sports
Kids' Choice Sports
Kids' Choice Sports
Kids' Choice Sports
Kids' Choice Sports
Kids' Choice Sports